Clinical Practice is a bimonthly peer-reviewed open access medical journal. It covers good clinical practice and health care. The journal was established in 2004 as Therapy by Future Drugs Ltd, obtaining its current name in 2012 when it was published by Future Medicine. It is now published by Open Access Journals, an imprint of the Pulsus Group, which is on Jeffrey Beall's list of "Potential, possible, or probable" predatory open-access publishers after being acquired by the OMICS Publishing Group in 2016.

Abstracting and indexing
The journal was abstracted and indexed in Chemical Abstracts Service (2012-2014) and Scopus (2012-2017).

References

External links

Creative Commons Attribution-licensed journals
Bimonthly journals
English-language journals
Publications established in 2004
Pulsus Group academic journals
General medical journals